Love Me Tender is a studio album by the American blues musician B.B. King. It was released via MCA Records in 1982. King supported the album by appearing on Austin City Limits.

The album peaked at No. 179 on the Billboard 200.

Production
Produced by Stewart Levine, the album was recorded in Nashville. The Muscle Shoals Horns appear on some tracks.

Critical reception

The New York Times panned the first side of Love Me Tender, calling it "bland, countrypolitan elevator music," but thought more highly of side two's "first-rate after-hours blues." The Globe and Mail wrote that "the singing is lugubrious, the playing is by rote, and the sound is so lush that King can barely be heard above it."

AllMusic called the album an "extremely ill-advised foray into mushy Nashville cornpone." The Rolling Stone Album Guide considered it a return to the "gentle sound" of Midnight Believer.

Track listing

References

B.B. King albums
1982 albums